Coryphellina hamanni is a species of sea slug, an aeolid nudibranch, a marine gastropod mollusc in the family Flabellinidae.

Distribution
This species is known from the Turks and Caicos and the Bahamas, Caribbean Sea.

Description 
The maximum recorded body length is 32 mm.

Ecology 
The minimum recorded depth for this species is 3 m; maximum recorded depth is 20 m.

References

Flabellinidae
Gastropods described in 1994